Robin of Earth-Two is an alternate version of the fictional superhero Robin, who appears in American comic books published by DC Comics. The character was introduced after DC Comics created Earth-Two, a parallel world that was retroactively established as the home of characters which had been published in the Golden Age of comic books. This allowed creators to publish comic books taking place in current continuity while being able to disregard Golden Age stories featuring Robin, solving an incongruity, as Robin had been published as a single ongoing incarnation since inception. Unlike his main counterpart, Robin is the only alter ego of Dick Grayson, who uses the title into adulthood, rather than taking on later codenames such as Nightwing or Batman. In addition, the name "Robin" is not taken on by later characters.

The character history of the Earth-Two Robin accordingly adopts all of the earliest stories featuring the character from the 1940s and 1950s, while the adventures of the mainstream Robin (who lived on "Earth-One") begin later in time and with certain elements of his origin retold. Both were depicted as separate, though parallel, individuals living in their respective universes, with the "older" Earth-Two character eventually reaching his retirement and death. After the events of DC's continuity-altering Flashpoint, Earth 2's Dick Grayson never adopted the role of Robin, which was instead originated by Helena Wayne, daughter of Earth-2's Batman and Catwoman, who later took the name Huntress. Dick instead married Barbara Gordon and lived an ordinary life until Darkseid's second invasion forced him to learn survival skills from Ted Grant.

Publication history

At the dawn of the Silver Age of comics, DC Comics decided to reimagine several of their greatest superheroes.  The Flash and Green Lantern were reimagined as Barry Allen and Hal Jordan. Superman and Batman were different and remained untouched. It was later revealed that the current heroes live on a parallel world to the Golden Age heroes. When Barry Allen met Jay Garrick, it meant there were two Flashes, two Green Lanterns, two Supermen, and two Batmen. Since Batman and Superman were the same, the divergence between the characters was their age.

Fictional character biography

Childhood and early history

Robin's origin and history begins the same as the classic version except the timeframe occurs when Detective Comics #38 was originally printed in 1940. Most of the events surrounding his formative years are the same, only earlier. After his parents are murdered in what appears to be a freak circus accident, Grayson confides in Batman. The hero advises him not to go to the police concerning what he overheard Anthony Zucco's men planning.  Batman feels a kinship to the boy, a period of training ensues, and the young Dick Grayson becomes Robin. His first printed story is "Robin the Boy Wonder." Robin participates in the war-time only All-Star Squadron. His distant cousin is Charles Grayson, the scientific assistant of Robotman.

Silver Age History
Eventually, Robin assumes Batman's position as Gotham City's premier crime fighter. Unlike his Earth-One counterpart, who distances himself from his mentor's shadow when he adopts his Nightwing persona, this version adopts a costume which mimics several elements of Batman's own uniform (including an insignia with an encircled "R" surrounded by two bat wings). While his younger doppelganger attends and then leaves college prematurely, Grayson pursues further education to attain his law degree. Eventually, he becomes a practicing attorney in the law firm that eventually becomes Cranston, Grayson and Wayne.

Robin was initiated into the Justice Society of America, assuming the membership vacated by Batman's retirement. During his tenure, he developed friendships with several members, most notably Johnny Thunder, while developing some animosity towards Hawkman who expressed reluctance towards his membership. Years later, Robin, along with his heroic colleagues, perished at the hands of the Justice League due to the involvement of Earth-Prime resident turned supervillain Cary Bates, however he was soon restored to life. After this experience he reverted to a variation of his traditional uniform's style and colors.

During his post-Gotham City career, Grayson left Gotham to become the United States Ambassador to South Africa during the mid-1970s while continuing his crime fighting career for a brief period in that country. His inclusion in the new Justice Society series, according to writer Gerry Conway, "was a nod to the present". After his involvement with the Justice Society of America when the villains Brainwave and Per Degaton attempt to destroy the world at several key points including China, South Africa and Seattle in the United States, he returns to Gotham City.

He joined Batman for one final adventure side-by-side, assisting the Justice Society, Justice League, and Shazam's Squadron of Justice in defeating several criminals including the Joker, during King Kull's plan to destroy humanity on all three Earths.

Shortly thereafter, then-Police Commissioner Bruce Wayne, while under the influence of the Psycho-Pirate, manipulates Robin and other formerly retired members of the Justice Society to attack the then-active members. 

He next became active assisting the Justice Society and Bruce's daughter Huntress (Helena Wayne) in dealing with Bill Jensen, a white-collar criminal apprehended by Wayne having attained mystical abilities. Robin and Huntress watched as Jensen threatened Gotham's twin trade towers and finally consumed himself along with Batman, eventually tracking down Frederick Vaux who provided Jensen with his abilities for unspecified reasons.

Grayson left Gotham after this incident, returning years later when the Joker came out of retirement to attack several prominent Gothamites including Police Commissioner O'Hara. Assuming the garb and identity of Batman, his presence mesmerized the Joker long enough to be apprehended by the Huntress. He proceeded to track the criminal mastermind behind Gotham's organized crime. At this point, he developed unexpressed feelings towards the Huntress, but left Gotham once more before pursuing them further.

During the "America vs. The Justice Society" miniseries, Grayson was later forced to prosecute a case against the Justice Society involving a diary written by Wayne, insinuating that the premier superhero team was a bunch of World War II Nazi collaborators. Grayson discovered that hidden within the passages was evidence pointing to Per Degaton's scheme, which was subsequently thwarted. He discovered from Helena that her father was influenced by his terminal cancer during his writing of the journal.

In the limited series Crisis on Infinite Earths, the multiverse is destroyed. Among the lost worlds is Earth-Two. Following this crisis Earth Two "never existed" and retroactively removed Earth-Two Robin from history, blending elements of his past with Earth-One, effectively creating a new modern continuity. Robin, along with the Huntress died while protecting innocents at the hands of shadow demons from the Anti-Matter Universe.

Divergence with Earth-One
Throughout his documented history, this version of Dick Grayson showed an unwavering allegiance towards Batman, even going so far as to take his mentor's vacated membership in the Justice Society of America. He adopted a costume similar to his mentor and used several retrofitted vehicles and devices derived from Batman's original versions rather than using the sort of unique equipment utilized by the Earth-One Grayson. He illustrated his complete faith in Batman by standing by his mentor when Commissioner Wayne was under the influence of the Psycho-Pirate and agreeing to prosecute the Justice Society when Wayne's alleged diary surfaced.

Robin developed resentment towards the Earth-One Batman during their first meeting after the original's death, which turned to grudging respect and finally acceptance. Previously, Robin showed a type of mentorship towards his younger counterpart, providing him a costume with elements he himself would eventually adopt.

52
In the final issue of 52, a new Multiverse is revealed, originally consisting of 52 identical realities. Among the parallel realities shown is one designated "Earth-2." As a result of Mister Mind "eating" aspects of this reality, it takes on visual aspects similar to the pre-Crisis Earth-Two, including Robin among other Justice Society of America characters.

Based on comments by Grant Morrison, this alternate universe is not the pre-Crisis Earth-2. However, in the Justice Society of America Annual #1, published in the summer of 2008, Silver Scarab explains that the events of the Crisis are remembered by the people of this Earth-2, and from their perspective, Earth-2 seemed to be the only Earth to have survived the Crisis, raising theories as to whether or not Earth-2 was really destroyed, or was perhaps replaced by a new Earth-2. Certainly Robin, Huntress, and their fellow Justice Society members are all alive.

However, it was confirmed in Justice Society Annual 1 (2008) that Post Crisis Earth-2 was completely separate from the Pre-Crisis Earth-Two. Here, Alan Scott was dead, Wonder Woman was retired and Queen of the Amazons, Jay Garrick was a young man (unconfirmed if the same man or his son) and most directly to this Grayson, Bruce Wayne was killed by the Joker. This was stated by both post-Crisis Earth-2 Helena and a dying aged Joker who knew the secret identities of the Earth-2 Batman, Robin and Huntress. In this same Annual, it was revealed that post-Crisis Earth-2 Dick Grayson was in love with Helena Wayne, and vice versa. They had not told one another of their feelings. This is a complete reversal from the original Pre Crisis Earth-Two versions who considered themselves to be brother and sister.

The New 52

In September 2011, The New 52 rebooted DC's continuity. In this new timeline, Earth 2 (adjusted from Earth-Two) is re-established into a wholly different alternate universe. In this continuity, Dick Grayson never became the partner of Earth-2's Batman. This Batman's only Robin was Helena, his daughter with Catwoman, and was trained by her parents as her father's partner. Following Batman's death at the end of an invasion from Apokolips, Earth-2's Supergirl and Robin were swept across alternate universes by an interdimensional vortex to DC's Prime Earth and have adopted new identities as the Power Girl and Huntress respectively.

Dick Grayson was married to Barbara Gordon and they have a son named John. When Darkseid did another invasion of Earth, Dick and Barbara had to take shelter. Due to the low morale, Dick and Ted Grant were deputized to deal with it. Following the death of Barbara, Dick hands his son over to Jonni Thunder for safekeeping as he goes to Chicago. After avenging his wife's murder, Dick is trained by Ted Grant in survival.

When Dick and Ted arrive at Atom's Haven, they are attacked by Obsidian until Jonni Thunder intervenes. Jonni reveals that their minds are being controlled by Brainwave. Before Dick and Ted can shoot Brainwave, Thomas Wayne as Batman and Huntress show up and knock out Brainwave before he can use a shuttle to leave Earth.

During the fight against Darkseid, Dick assisted Batman in rescuing the inhabitants before Apokolips engulfs Earth.

During the "Convergence" storyline, Dick and Batman land the ship of survivors on the planet Telos were its self-titled entity states that a war of the worlds will begin. Batman and Dick go to the Gotham in the dome that they are placed in as Batman works to keep Dick from either getting himself killed or ruining Alan Scott's plans. They encounter the New Earth version of Batman, Alfred Pennyworth, and Barbara Gordon. New Earth Batman lends his Batplane for Dick and Batman to use. When the enemies of New Earth's Batman closes in on them, Dick is kept away from the conflict as Batman uses a bomb hidden on him to stop the villains. New Earth Joker shoots Robin in the spine only for Telos to kill New Earth Joker as he asks Dick where his allies are. Seeing that Dick is fighting to survive, Telos gives Dick the opportunity to save himself by offering to heal his broken spine with his molding metal while stating that he will have to take part in the Convergence. Dick accepts the offer.

Following the "Convergence" storyline, Dick has become the new Batman and was pursuing Terry Sloane. He then flashbacked to when the metallic mold faded rendering him paralytic upon Telos' departure as the survivors settled on a new world. After the flashback, Terry Sloane escaped with the help of Johnny Sorrow. After regaining conscious from crashing into a searchlight, Batman is greeted by Flash and Huntress as Doctor Impossible shows up. Batman finally catches up to Terry Sloane who has gained access to a terraformer from the Source Vault which he plans to turn the new world into a replica of Earth 2.

Powers and abilities
Dick's abilities and equipment are the same as his Earth-One counterpart.

In other media

Live-action
 The first live-action depictions of Dick Grayson/Robin appearing in the 1941 serial The Batman (played by Douglas Croft) and the 1966-68 Tv series Batman and it's film adaptation (played by Burt Ward) were visually based on both the Golden Age and Silver Age versions of Robin, with Croft's version evoking the more dour Golden Age era and Ward's version more famously evoking the sillier and pulpier Silver Age era.
 Despite being primarily inspired by the Bronze/Modern Ages variant, Dick Grayson/Robin (played by Chris O'Donnell) in the 1995 film Batman Forever, as a joke, exclaims "Holey rusted metal, Batman!" when infiltrating The Riddler's (played by Jim Carrey) mechanical island hideout, explaining the rock bank is actual porous metal to a confused Batman (played by Val Kilmer), referencing Robin's famous "Holy X, Batman!" catchphrase from the 1960's show.

Animation
 Dick Grayson/Robin's appearance in the 1973-1985 cartoon franchise Super Friends was primarily based on his Silver Age depiction, voiced by Casey Kasem.
 The Silver Age version of Dick Grayson/Robin played a minor role in the 2008 animated movie Justice League: The New Frontier (based on the 2004 graphic novel of the same name, voiced by Shane Haboucha. He appears in costume to greet Superman when he visits Batman in the Batcave, introducing himself to the Man of Steel as the Dark Knight's new sidekick, only to be dismissed by Batman to finish his homework.

See also
 All-Star Squadron
 Golden Age Robin
 Golden Age Catwoman
 Huntress (Helena Wayne)
 Justice Society of America
 Multiverse (DC Comics)
 Superman (Kal-L)

References

Batman characters
Characters created by Gardner Fox
Characters created by Mike Sekowsky
Comics characters introduced in 1967
DC Comics male superheroes
DC Comics martial artists
DC Comics orphans
DC Comics sidekicks
Earth-Two
Fictional acrobats
Fictional ambassadors
Fictional lawyers
Fictional detectives
Fictional escapologists
Robin (character)
Dick Grayson
Vigilante characters in comics